Vilma Jean Napier Brown (21 July 1932  11 September 2021), known professionally as Vilma Hollingbery, was a British character actress. She appeared in various television programmes and films over a span of sixty years, and was known for her appearances as Claudia Wren in Psychoville, and has also appeared in A Touch of Frost, the 1980 film Babylon, Doctor Who and The Bill, in which she appeared six times as different characters. She also portrayed Barbara in Motherland.

She was married to the actor and director Michael Napier Brown, the couple had a daughter together, who also became an actress. Napier Brown died in August 2016. Hollingbery died on 11 September 2021, aged 89.

Filmography

References

External links

Vilma Hollingbery at the British Film Institute
Vilma Hollingbery (Aveleyman)

British actresses
1932 births
2021 deaths